The Cinematograph Films Act 1927 (17 & 18 Geo. V) was an act of the UK Parliament designed to stimulate the declining British film industry. It received royal assent on 22 December 1927 and came into force on 1 April 1928.

Description
The act introduced a requirement for British cinemas to show a quota of British films for a duration of 10 years. Its supporters believed that it would promote the emergence of a vertically integrated film industry, with production, distribution and exhibition infrastructure controlled by the same companies. As the vertically integrated American film industry had rapid growth in the years immediately following the end of World War I, the intention was to counter Hollywood's perceived economic and cultural dominance by promoting similar business practices among British studios, distributors and cinema chains.

By creating an obligatory market-section for British films, it was hoped that the increased economic activity in the production sector would lead to the growth of a self-sustaining industry. The quota was initially set at 7.5% for exhibitors but was raised to 20% in 1935. The films included those shot in British dominions such as Canada and Australia.

A British film was defined according to the following criteria:

 The film must be made by a British or British-controlled company.
 Studio scenes must be photographed within a film studio in the British Empire.
 The author of the scenario or the original work on which the screenplay was based must be a British subject.
 At least 75% of the salaries must be paid to British subjects, excluding the costs of two persons, at least one of whom must be an actor. (That caveat refers to the fact that a British film could engage a highly paid international star, producer or director but still be regarded as a British film.)

Consequences

The act is not generally considered to have been a success. It fostered speculative investment in lavishly budgeted features for which production costs could not have been recouped on the domestic market, and it was criticised for the emergence of opportunistic "quota quickies" — films that promised quick financial return despite modest production investment. They were mostly low-cost, low-quality, quickly produced films, commissioned by American distributors active in the UK, or by British cinema owners purely to satisfy the quota requirements.

The act was modified by the Cinematograph Films Act 1938, which removed films shot in British Empire countries from the quota. It was, in turn, amended by further acts, and it was eventually repealed by the Films Act 1960.

In recent years, an alternative view has arisen among film historians, such as Lawrence Napper, who have argued that the quota quickie has been too casually dismissed, and is of particular cultural and historical value because such films often contained performances unique to British popular culture, such as music hall and variety acts, that would not have been filmed under normal circumstances.

See also
 Canadian content
 B movie

References

Bibliography 
 Nobody Ordered Wolves, Jeffrey Dell, London & Toronto, William Heinemann, 1939.
 Michael Chanan, 'State Protection of a Beleaguered Industry' in British Cinema History, James Curran & Vincent Porter (eds.), London, Weidenfeld & Nicolson, 1983, pp. 59–73.
 The Age of the Dream Palace: Cinema and Society in Britain, 1930–39, Jeffrey Richards, London, Routledge, 1984.
 Cinema and State: The Film Industry and the Government, 1927–1984, Margaret Dickinson & Sarah Street, London, British Film Institute, 1985.
 Dissolving Views: Key Writings on British Cinema, Andrew Higson (ed.), London, Cassell, 1996.
 'The British Film Industry's Production Sector Difficulties in the Late 1930s', John Sedgwick, Historical Journal of Film, Radio and Television, vol. 17, no. 1 (1997), pp. 49–66.
 The Unknown 1930s: An Alternative History of the British Cinema 1929–1939, Jeffrey Richards, Manchester, I.B. Tauris (2001).
 Lawrence Napper, 'A Despicable Tradition? Quota Quickies in the 1930s' in The British Cinema Book (2nd edition), Robert Murphy (ed.), London, BFI Publishing, 2001, pp. 37–47.
 Steve Chibnall, Quota Quickies: The Birth of the British ‘B’ Film (London: British Film Institute, 2007) [reviewed ]

External links
 In Praise of the Quota

United Kingdom Acts of Parliament 1927
1927 in film
Repealed United Kingdom Acts of Parliament
Media legislation
Quota quickies
History of mass media in the United Kingdom
1930s in British cinema
1920s in British cinema